Manchester is a city in St. Louis County, Missouri, United States. The population was 18,333 at the 2020 census.

History

Manchester was named by an English settler after Manchester, England.

Geography
Manchester is located at  (38.584244, -90.507449).

Demographics

2020 census
As of the 2020 census, 18,333 people and 7,466 households were living in the city. The racial makeup of the city was 81.3% White (80.3% non-Hispanic White), 3.6% African American, 0.1% Native American, 6.8% Asian, 1.3% from other races, and 6.9% from two or more races. Hispanic or Latino of any race were 4.0% of the population.

2010 census
As of the census of 2010, there were 18,094 people, 7,239 households, and 5,048 families living in the city. The racial makeup of the city was 87.6% White, 3.1% African American, 0.2% Native American, 6.0% Asian, 1.1% from other races, and 2.1% from two or more races. Hispanic or Latino of any race were 2.9% of the population.

There were 7,239 households, of which 32.4% had children under the age of 18 living with them, 57.7% were married couples living together, 8.7% had a female householder with no husband present, 3.3% had a male householder with no wife present, and 30.3% were non-families. 24.3% of all households were made up of individuals, and 7.7% had someone living alone who was 65 years of age or older. The average household size was 2.50 and the average family size was 3.00.

The median age in the city was 38.9 years. 23.5% of residents were under the age of 18; 8% were between the ages of 18 and 24; 26.2% were from 25 to 44; 29.5% were from 45 to 64; and 12.9% were 65 years of age or older. The gender makeup of the city was 48.7% male and 51.3% female.

2000 census
As of the census of 2000, there were 19,161 people, 7,206 households, and 5,332 families living in the city. The racial makeup of the city was 91.60% White, 2.42% African American, 0.09% Native American, 4.33% Asian, 0.03% Pacific Islander, 0.40% from other races, and 1.13% from two or more races. Hispanic or Latino of any race were 1.52% of the population.

There were 7,206 households, out of which 37.5% had children under the age of 18 living with them, 63.3% were married couples living together, 8.2% had a female householder with no husband present, and 26.0% were non-families. 20.6% of all households were made up of individuals, and 5.4% had someone living alone who was 65 years of age or older. The average household size was 2.66 and the average family size was 3.12.

In the city, the population was spread out, with 27.2% under the age of 18, 7.5% from 18 to 24, 30.8% from 25 to 44, 25.5% from 45 to 64, and 9.0% who were 65 years of age or older. The median age was 36 years. For every 100 females, there were 95.0 males. For every 100 females age 18 and over, there were 90.6 males.

The median income for a household in the city was $64,381, and the median income for a family was $71,329. Males had a median income of $50,783 versus $35,039 for females. The per capita income for the city was $27,663. About 1.5% of families and 3.0% of the population were below the poverty line, including 3.4% of those under age 18 and 1.1% of those age 65 or over.

Education
The Parkway School District has one high school located within the Manchester city limits: Parkway South High School. Two middle schools (South Middle and Southwest Middle) serve this high school area, and several elementary schools bring education to the neighborhood level. Hanna Woods, Carman Trails, and Wren Hollow are some of the elementary schools that serve Manchester.

The Grand Glaize Branch of St. Louis County Library is in Manchester.

References

External links
 City of Manchester official website

Cities in St. Louis County, Missouri
Cities in Missouri